Someone to Remember is a 1943 American drama film directed by Robert Siodmak and written by Frances Hyland. The film stars Mabel Paige, Harry Shannon, John Craven, Dorothy Morris, Charles Dingle and David Bacon. The film was released on August 21, 1943, by Republic Pictures.

Plot
A college buys her residential building and intends to evict her, but elderly Sarah Freeman explains that she has an iron-clad lease that only she can break. School representative Jim Parsons agrees to let her stay, whereupon incoming male students discover that an old woman will be sharing their dorm.

The boys take a liking to Sarah, who has spent 27 years there waiting for the return of a missing grandson, unwilling to believe he is gone for good. After she helps a young couple, Lucia and Tom, with their romance and studies, Sarah believes the missing boy is about to visit at long last. Her heart gives out from the excitement. Soon thereafter, a friend reveals that the boy was killed many years ago, but that no one had been able to get Sarah to accept it.

Cast  
Mabel Paige as Mrs. Freeman
Harry Shannon as Tom Gibbons
John Craven as Dan Freeman
Dorothy Morris as Lucia Stanton
Charles Dingle as Jim Parsons
David Bacon as Ike Dale
Peter Lawford as Joe Downes
Tom Seidel as Bill Hedge
Richard Crane as Paul Parker
Chester Clute as Mr. Roseby
Elizabeth Dunne as Timid Miss Green
Vera Lewis as Aggressive Miss Green
John Good as Charlie Horne
Russell Hicks as Mr. Stanton
Wilbur Mack as Mr. Thurber

References

External links
 

1943 films
American black-and-white films
American drama films
1940s English-language films
Films directed by Robert Siodmak
Films scored by Walter Scharf
Films set in universities and colleges
Republic Pictures films
1943 drama films
1940s American films